Shiprock is an unincorporated community on the Navajo reservation in San Juan County, New Mexico, United States. The population was 7,718 people in the 2020 census. For statistical purposes, the United States Census Bureau has defined Shiprock as a census-designated place (CDP). It is part of the Farmington Metropolitan Statistical Area.

Shiprock is named after the nearby Shiprock rock formation. Since 1903, the town has been called Naat’áanii Nééz (meaning “tall leader” in the Navajo language) after the San Juan Indian Agency superintendent William T. Shelton who settled Shiprock for the United States government. 

Diné College is a local four-year college (formerly Navajo Community College), a tribally controlled community college with seven other campuses across the Navajo Nation. It is the site of a Chapter House for the Navajo, a Bureau of Indian Affairs agency and the Northern Navajo Medical Center (an Indian Health Service hospital).

The town is a key road junction for truck traffic and tourists visiting the Four Corners, Mesa Verde, Shiprock and the Grand Canyon. It lies at the intersection of U.S. Route 64 and U.S. Route 491 (formerly U.S. Route 666). The annual Northern Navajo Fair is held every October. Since 1984, the community has hosted the Shiprock Marathon and Relay.

History 

Shiprock was founded on September 11, 1903, by San Juan Agency superintendent William Taylor Shelton after being assigned to the northern Navajo by the Bureau of Indian Affairs. A former U.S. government instructor in agriculture at the Cherokee School in Yellow Hill, North Carolina (now Cherokee, NC), Shelton had moved up through BIA ranks to be given the appointment to open an Indian agency and boarding school. He founded Shiprock Indian School and administrative agency with a staff of three white and three Navajo employees. Shiprock Indian Boarding School remained until the American Indian boarding school system was phased out in the early 1980s.

The settlement encompassed land originally belonging to Tséheya Begay. According to one of Shelton's early reports, Navajo had been irrigating the land for many years, with 275 farms drawing water from approximately 25 ditches between the Shiprock area and Farmington. Under Shelton, the agency expanded the irrigation system and developed a dairy herd as part of its agricultural program; a sawmill near Sanostee and coal mine in the Hogback area were also developed. Early buildings in Shiprock were constructed of log and adobe, but brick replaced these materials after the disastrous flood of 1912. The superintendent was known as a disciplinarian who was ruthless in his prosecution of “moral lapses,” but is said to have been generally respected throughout the region, particularly for his efforts in adding the Utah-Colorado extension to the main Navajo Reservation.

Navajo Corrections operated the Shiprock District Department of Corrections jail facility in Shiprock. It had a capacity of twelve, and after being cited for mold complaints, closed in 2021.

Geography

Demographics

As of the census of 2000, there were 8,156 people, 2,184 households, and 1,847 families residing in the CDP. The population density was 513.6 people per square mile (198.3/km). There were 2,594 housing units at an average density of 163.3 per square mile (63.1/km). The racial makeup of the CDP was 96.74% Native American, 2.17% White, 0.16% African American, 0.12% Asian, 0.01% Pacific Islander, 0.10% from other races, and 0.70% from two or more races. Hispanic or Latino of any race were 1.29% of the population. In 2010, the population of Shiprock was 8,295, which is an increase of +1.7% since 2000.

There were 2,184 households, out of which 52.2% had children under the age of 18 living with them, 48.0% were married couples living together, 28.7% had a female householder with no husband present, and 15.4% were non-families. 13.6% of all households were made up of individuals, and 3.7% had someone living alone who was 65 years of age or older. The average household size was 3.73 and the average family size was 4.06.

In the CDP, the population was spread out, with 38.6% under the age of 18, 11.6% from 18 to 24, 28.4% from 25 to 44, 16.5% from 45 to 64, and 4.9% who were 65 years of age or older. The median age was 25 years. For every 100 females, there were 92.8 males. For every 100 females age 18 and over, there were 86.3 males.

The median income for a household in the CDP was $24,523, and the median income for a family was $24,951. Males had a median income of $24,032 versus $17,328 for females. The per capita income for the CDP was $7,967. About 38.3% of families and 39.2% of the population were below the poverty line, including 43.2% of those under age 18 and 47.5% of those age 65 or over. In 2010, estimated median household income was $31,805, which is 29.7% above the value in 2000 (it was $24,523 in 2000).

Government
The Shiprock Chapter government is a branch of the Navajo Nation government which exercise varied delegated powers and governmental authority in accordance with Navajo statutory, regulatory, and common law. The basis of local government for the Navajo Reservation, the Chapter was initiated in 1922 as a means of improving agricultural conditions at a local level. Later the Chapter became the basic political subdivision of Navajo Tribal Government. The Chapters elect representatives to the Navajo Tribal Council, the legislative branch of Navajo government.

Education

The Central Consolidated School District serves Shiprock as well as other communities in western San Juan County. Shiprock is home to Shiprock High School, Career Prep High School, Tsé Bit'a'í Middle School, Mesa Elementary School, Nizhoni Elementary School, Eva B. Stokely Elementary School

Shiprock Associated Schools, Inc., associated with the Bureau of Indian Education (BIE), operates Atsá Biyáázh Community School and Shiprock Northwest High School (7th to 12th grade).

Media

Film location
The 1987 film Made in U.S.A. directed by Ken Friedman and starring Adrian Pasdar, Chris Penn and Lori Singer is partially referred to Shiprock.

Paramount's 1994 film Pontiac Moon starring Ted Danson was partially shot here.

In 1996 the location was the focus of the film ‘The Sunchaser’ starring Woody Harrelson, a fictional story of a surgeon who helps a Navajo teen reach the mountain. 

It was one of the filming locations for the 1994 crime film Natural Born Killers.

The 2002 film Rocks With Wings, directed by Rick Derby, follows the Navajo members of the Lady Chieftains, the girls' basketball team from Shiprock High School, as they struggle with a new (black) coach, their own expectations, and those of their community and the "Anglo" world around them.

The 2017 documentary Mayors of Shiprock focuses on the group of native youths who are making a positive change in their community.

Notable people
Joyce Begay-Foss, Navajo weaver, educator, and curator, was born in Shiprock.
Amber Midthunder, Sioux Actress best known for her work as Naru in the movie Prey, was born in Shiprock.

References

Census-designated places in San Juan County, New Mexico
Census-designated places in New Mexico
Populated places on the Navajo Nation